Carmaux, défournage du coke (translated as Drawing Out the coke) is a film made in 1896 by Lumière. The location was the Saut-du-Tarn Steel Works at Carmaux, France  near the river Tarn in southern France. It is a one-minute sequence of men lifting a large coal block out of a smelter. One man is spraying water to cool the block while others use rakes to spread it out. Others can be seen pushing coal carts along a track.

See also
Lumière
Carmaux
Coal

External links
 
 Carmaux, défournage du coke on YouTube
Watch Carmaux, défournage du coke

1896 films
French black-and-white films
French silent short films
Films directed by Auguste and Louis Lumière
1896 short films
Black-and-white documentary films
1890s French films